Vasek Pospisil and Jack Sock were the defending champions, but lost in the first round to Colin Fleming and Gilles Müller.
Bob and Mike Bryan won the title, defeating Fleming and Müller in the final, 4–6, 7–6(7–2), [10–4].

Seeds

Draw

Draw

References
 Main Draw

2015 US Open Series
BBandT Atlanta Open - Doubles
2015 Doubles
Atlanta